Francisco Reynolds Baker (1882 – c. 1967) was an Argentine politician and military man, who served as director of the Argentine Military School, and as president of Superior Council of War and Navy.

Biography 

He was born in Buenos Aires, the son of Francisco Reynolds, a soldier belonging to an Anglo-Creole family of Buenos Aires, and Alice Baker Spencer, born in New York. He was director of the military school from 1929 to 1933, being appointed that same year to occupy the command of Army Arsenals. 

Francisco Reynolds took an active part in the military political events of 1930 against the government of Hipólito Yrigoyen. In 1938, he was appointed to the command of 1st Argentine Army Division. He also served as head of the Supreme War Council during the presidency of Juan Domingo Perón.

References 

1880s births
1960s deaths
British Argentine
People from Buenos Aires
Argentine Army officers
Argentine colonels
Argentine generals
20th-century Argentine politicians
Argentine people of English descent
Argentine people of American descent
Argentine people of Spanish descent